John Baer may refer to:
John Baer (journalist), American journalist at the Philadelphia Daily News
John Metz Baer, American professor of educational psychology
John Miller Baer (1886–1970), American congressman from North Dakota
John Willis Baer (1861–1931), American Presbyterian leader and college president
John Baer (actor) (1923–2006), American actor in Terry and the Pirates and other works

See also
 John Bear (disambiguation)